Charles Finch is an American author.

Charles Finch may also refer to: 

 Charles Finch, 4th Earl of Winchilsea (1672–1712), British peer and Member of Parliament
 Charles Finch (MP) (1752–1819), British member of Parliament for Castle Rising and Maidstone
 Charles B. Finch (1920–1996), American businessman
 Charles Finch (British businessman) (born 1962), British businessman, writer, director, producer and publisher
 Charles Wray Finch (1809–1873), Australian politician
 Charles Finch (actor)
 Cliff Finch (Charles Clifton Finch, 1927–1986), American politician and former Governor of Mississippi

See also
 Finch (surname)